Chlorhoda rufoviridis is a moth of the subfamily Arctiinae first described by Francis Walker in 1865. It is found in Colombia and Peru.

References

Arctiini